Mario Cuevas (born 22 July 1949) is a Mexican long-distance runner. He competed in the marathon at the 1976 Summer Olympics.

References

1949 births
Living people
Athletes (track and field) at the 1976 Summer Olympics
Mexican male long-distance runners
Mexican male marathon runners
Olympic athletes of Mexico
Place of birth missing (living people)
Central American and Caribbean Games medalists in athletics
20th-century Mexican people